The Warrant Officer to the Royal Navy (WORN) (previously known as the Warrant Officer of the Naval Service) is the most senior warrant officer and rating of the Royal Navy. The person holding this appointment's main responsibility is to act as a channel between the non commissioned ranks and Senior Naval officers, enabling communication between the Sailors and Marines and the Senior Navy leadership.

The post was created in 2010, replacing the post of Second Sea Lord's Command Warrant Officer.

Insignia
A command warrant officer badge is worn on the left breast of their uniform during the period of the appointment.

Appointees

See also
 Warrant Officer of the Royal Air Force – the Royal Air Force equivalent
 Corps Regimental Sergeant Major – Royal Marines 
 Army Sergeant Major – British Army equivalent

References

Royal Navy
Royal Navy appointments
Warrant officers